Deborah Brevoort is an American playwright, librettist and lyricist best known for her play The Women of Lockerbie. She teaches Creative Writing at several universities.

Early years

Brevoort was born in Columbus, Ohio to Virginia and Gordon Brevoort.  She is the oldest of three children. She graduated from Ridgewood High School in Ridgewood, NJ.  She attended Kent State University where she received a BA in English and Political Science, and an MA in Political Science.

Deborah moved to Juneau, Alaska in 1979. She worked in Alaskan politics serving as a special assistant to Lt. Governor Terry Miller and Alaska State Senator Frank Ferguson.  In 1983 she became the Producing Director of Perseverance Theatre and an actor in the company. Her first two plays were produced at Perseverance: The Last Frontier Club and Signs of Life.   Signs of Life was awarded a Rockefeller Foundation playwriting grant and was later published by Samuel French.

Brevoort left Alaska to attend Brown University in Providence RI, where she received her MFA in Playwriting. She moved to New York City to attend New York University's Graduate Musical Theatre Writing Program where she received an MFA.

Career
Brevoort is best known for her play The Women of Lockerbie, a story about the aftermath of the bombing of Pan Am 103 over Lockerbie, Scotland, told in the form of a Greek tragedy.  It was inspired by the laundry project undertaken by Lockerbie women, who washed the clothes of the victims and returned them to the families.  In 2001 it won the silver medal in the Onassis International Playwriting Competition and the Kennedy Center Fund for New American Plays Award.  It premiered Off-Broadway in 2003 by the New Group and Women's Project. It was produced in London at the Orange Tree Theatre in 2005, at the Theater Royal in Dumfries, at the Actor's Gang in Los Angeles in 2007 and the Will Geer Theater in Santa Monica in 2012.  It is published by Dramatists Play Service and has been translated into nine languages.

Brevoort's plays and musicals often use theatrical conventions and forms from around the world to explore contemporary American subjects. She wrote a Japanese Noh Drama about Elvis Presley called Blue Moon Over Memphis, which was published by Applause Books in The Best American Short Plays of 2004; a musical comedy inspired by world mythology and Saturday morning cartoons called Coyote Goes Salmon Fishing, with composer Scott Davenport Richards in 1998; and a holiday musical written in the form of an oratorio, called King Island Christmas, with composer David Friedman, based on the Alaskan children's book of the same title in 1999.  Both Coyote Goes Salmon Fishing and King Island Christmas won the Frederick Loewe Award in musical theatre.

She used the methods of magic realism from Latin American novels to dramatize life in an Alaskan fishing town in her play Into the Fire, which won the Weissberger Award in 1999 and was published by Samuel French in 2000.

Deborah's plays include: 

The Poetry of Pizza which uses the conventions of farce and romantic comedy to explore Arab/American relations and love across cultures.  It was developed in the Centenary Stage Women's Playwright's Festival and was subsequently produced at the Purple Rose Theatre, Virginia Stage, Mixed Blood Theatre, California Rep, Theatre in the Square and Stage 3.

The Blue-Sky Boys, about NASA's Apollo engineers and the intersection of creativity and science, with a commission from the EST/Alfred P. Sloan Foundation Science & Technology project.  It premiered at the Barter Theatre in Virginia and was subsequently produced by Capital Rep in Albany, NY.

The Velvet Weapon, using the back stage farce to dramatize populist democracy movements in the US. The play was written with a grant from CEC Arts Link and is inspired by the Velvet Revolution of Czechoslovakia.

The Comfort Team, a play about military spouses, with a commission from Virginia Stage.  It received an artistic excellence grant from the National Endowment for the Arts and the first-ever theatre grant from the Harpo Marx Foundation.

Deborah won the Liberty Live commission from Premiere Stages to write My Lord, What a Night, a one act play about Marian Anderson and Albert Einstein. It was produced at the Liberty Museum/Premiere Stage in 2016.  She has since turned the play into a full-length, which is being produced in a Rolling World Premiere by the National New Play Network.  It premiered at the Contemporary American Theatre Festival in Shepherdstown, W. Va in 2019.  Subsequent productions at Orlando Shakes and Florida Studio Theatre were postponed due to the COVID-19 pandemic and have been rescheduled for production sometime in 2021.  My Lord, What a Night, was produced by the historic Ford's Theatre in Washington DC, where it reopened the theatre after the pandemic in 2021.

During the COVID-19 pandemic, Deborah was commissioned by the Florida Studio Theatre to write a full length comedy called The Drolls.  She was also commissioned to write The Gorn Galaxy, a 10-minute play, for the Flash Acts Festival, produced by Arena Stage, Georgetown University, the Center for Global Engagement and the American Embassy in Moscow. It was produced in both the US and Russia and is available to view online at FlashActsFestival.org.

Deborah also writes opera librettos and the book and lyrics for musicals. Her musical works include:
 
Embedded, a one-act opera inspired by Edgar Allan Poe stories with composer Patrick Soluri for the American Lyric Theater. "Embedded won the inaugural Frontiers Competition at Ft. Worth Opera where it was subsequently produced in 2016.  It was also produced at Fargo Moorhead Opera in 2014.

Steal a Pencil for Me, a full-length opera about Holocaust survivors, based on the book of the same title, with composer Gerald Cohen, which won the Frontiers Competition at Ft. Worth Opera in 2016.  It premiered at Opera Colorado in 2018.

"Albert Nobbs" with composer Patrick Soluri.  It was a finalist for the Dominic Pellicciotti Prize in Opera Composition.  It was also the winner of the Frontiers competition in 2019 at Ft. Worth Opera.

"Murasaki's Moon" an opera with composer Michi Wiancko, commissioned by the Metropolitan Museum of Art, On Site Opera and American Lyric Theater.  It was produced at the Met museum in 2019.

"The Knock," an opera she conceived, written with composer Aleksandra Vrebalov and commissioned by the Glimmerglass Opera Festival, where it was produced as a film in 2021. It will have its stage premiere at Cincinnati Opera in 2023.

During the COVID-19 pandemic, Deborah was commissioned by Fargo Moorhead Opera and the Decameron Opera Coalition to write Dinner 4 3, a 10-minute opera with composer Michael Ching, inspired by a story from The Decameron, as part of a new opera web series called Tales from a Safe Distance.  

She was also commissioned by the Chicago Opera Theatre to write "Quamino's Map" with composer Errollyn Wallen for a spring 2022 premiere

Deborah was commissioned by the Anchorage Opera to write "The Polar Bat," a new adaptation of "Die Fledermaus" which was produced there in 2014. In 2015, the Anchorage Opera commissioned and produced her new libretto for Mozart's "The Impresario."

Deborah wrote the book and lyrics for "Crossing Over" an Amish Hip Hop musical with composer and co-lyricist Stephanie Salzman.  It was developed in the ASCAP workshop, and also in the "Grow a Show" program at the Lied Center in Lincoln, Nebraska. It has also received development at NYC's Cap 21 and the Theatre Barn.

She is a member of ASCAP, The Dramatists Guild, Opera America, TCG and the National Theatre Conference. She was invited to join the Playwright's Collective at Florida Studio Theatre in 2020.

Brevoort teaches at Columbia University and New York University. She taught for many years at Goddard College.

Personal life
Brevoort is married  to the actor Chuck Cooper.

List of works

Plays
 "The Drolls"  (2020)
  "The Gorn Galaxy" (2020)
 "My Lord, What a Night." (2019)
 The Comfort Team (2012)
 The Blue-Sky Boys (2009)
 The Velvet Weapon (2014)
 The Cheechako Treatment (2008)
 The Poetry of Pizza (2007)
 The Women of Lockerbie  (2003)
 Blue Moon Over Memphis  (2001)
 Into the Fire  (2000)
 Signs of Life  (1990)
 Last Frontier Club (1987)

Musicals
 Crossing Over, an Amish Hip Hop musical with Stephanie Salzman (2015)
 Goodbye My Island with David Friedman (2004)
 King Island Christmas with David Friedman (1999)
 Coyote Goes Salmon Fishing with Scott Davenport Richards (1998)

Operas
 "Quamino's Map" with Errollyn Wallen (2022)  
"The Knock" with Aleksandra Vrebalov (2020)
 "Dinner 4 3" with Michael Ching (2020)
 "Murasaki's Moon" with Michi Wiancko (2019)
 "Albert Nobbs" with Patrick Soluri (2018)
 Steal a Pencil for Me with Gerald Cohen (2012)
 Embedded with Patrick Soluri (2011)
 Altezura with Aleksandra Vrebalov (2008)
 "The Polar Bat" a new adaptation of "Die Fledermaus" (2014)
 "The Impresario" a new libretto of Mozart's comic opera for the Anchorage Opera (2015)

Screenplays
 Mexico in Alaska (1999)
 Covered Dishes (1997)

Honors and awards

 Silver medal, Onassis International Playwriting Competition for The Women of Lockerbie
 Kennedy Center Fund for New American Plays Award for The Women of Lockerbie
 Frederick Loewe Award in Musical Theatre for Coyote Goes Salmon Fishing and King Island Christmas
 Paul Green Award (National Theatre Conference) for musical book writing
 L. Arnold Weissberger Award for Into the Fire
 Jane Chambers Award for Signs of Life
 Performing Artist/Writer Fellowship, American Antiquarian Society

References

External links 
 Deborah Brevoort Official Website
 King Island Christmas Website
 MFA Faculty of Goddard College
 New York University Graduate Musical Theatre Writing Program
 Columbia University Theatre Arts Program

1954 births
Living people
20th-century American dramatists and playwrights
Kent State University alumni
Brown University alumni
Tisch School of the Arts alumni
American women dramatists and playwrights
20th-century American women writers
American opera librettists
Women opera librettists
21st-century American dramatists and playwrights
21st-century American women writers
Writers from Columbus, Ohio
Columbia University faculty
New York University faculty
Goddard College faculty